Lowyat.net is a popular Internet forum and technology magazine website in Malaysia. It has no formal connection to Plaza Low Yat, a well-known IT shopping mall in Kuala Lumpur.

History 
Lowyat.Net started in 2002 as a simple website publishing the price list of computers and gadgets from Low Yat Plaza founded by Vijandren Ramadass. In 2011, Lowyat Networks obtained MSC status and expanded its portfolio with the launching of Lipstiq.com, a women’s lifestyle portal.

Networks 
Besides internet forum and technology magazine, Lowyat Networks also include:

Visitors 
, lowyat.net is the 13th most visited website in Malaysia.

References 

2002 establishments in Malaysia
Internet forums
Online companies of Malaysia
Privately held companies of Malaysia
Internet properties established in 2002